Anne Stambach-Terrenoir (born 23 June 1980) is a French politician from La France Insoumise (NUPES) who has represented Haute-Garonne's 2nd constituency in the National Assembly since 2022.

References 

1980 births

Living people
21st-century French politicians
21st-century French women politicians
Deputies of the 16th National Assembly of the French Fifth Republic
Women members of the National Assembly (France)
Members of Parliament for Haute-Garonne

La France Insoumise politicians